Pseudapistosia is a genus of moths in the family Erebidae.

Species
 Pseudapistosia leucocorypha Dognin, 1914
 Pseudapistosia similis Hampson, 1901
 Pseudapistosia umber Cramer, 1775

References

Natural History Museum Lepidoptera generic names catalog

Phaegopterina
Moth genera